The Husky Lloydminster Ethanol Plant is located in Lloydminster, Saskatchewan, Canada next to the Husky Lloydminster Upgrader and Meridian Power Station.  The plant is owned by Husky Energy and produces 130 million litres of ethanol per year.  In Canada ethanol is blended into gasoline.  The plant feedstock for the facility is non-food feed-grade wheat purchased from local growers; however the plant is also capable of using corn as a feed-stock.  The feed-stock is milled, cooked, fermented, distilled and dehydrated resulting in ethanol fuel and the remaining waste material is processed into a high protein feed 
supplement.

The plant was constructed at a cost of between $90–95 Million Canadian, and came on line in 2006.

References

Buildings and structures in Lloydminster
Alcohol fuel producers
Husky Energy subsidiaries